Holiday in Handcuffs is a 2007 American crime comedy television film that originally aired on ABC Family on December 9 as a part of the network's 25 Days of Christmas programming block. The film stars Melissa Joan Hart, Mario Lopez,  Markie Post, Timothy Bottoms, June Lockhart, Kyle Howard and Vanessa Lee Evigan.

Plot
Trudie is an aspiring painter working as a restaurant waitress. With the pressure to please her parents building, she misses a job interview and gets dumped by her boyfriend just before Christmas, and she has a nervous breakdown. Stressed about going home for the holidays without a boyfriend, she kidnaps David Martin, a random customer at the restaurant in which she works and introduces him to her parents as her boyfriend, Nick.  Trudie's family is vacationing at a very isolated log cabin away from anyone else, so David is unable to escape, although he makes several attempts. He finally decides to play along until the police come, but ultimately falls in love with Trudie and understands the family pressure that made her feel forced to kidnap him in the first place.

During Christmas dinner, the holiday comes to an abrupt end when Trudie's parents begin to fight, her brother Jake announces that he is gay, and her sister Katie says that she has quit law school and bought a Pilates studio with her parents' tuition money. The police then arrive and arrest the family during Christmas dinner, revealing that David is not actually Trudie's boyfriend. Before he was kidnapped, David had a successful job and a beautiful, rich girlfriend; however, during his time with Trudie and her family, he realizes his life has developed into something he did not intend. After the family is released (except for Trudie's grandma Dolores for attempting to resist arrest), when David decides not to press charges, Trudie does not see or hear from David for a few months, but learns that he will be engaged.

Trudie is invited to show her art at a local gallery, which her family attends and she reconciles with them, and is stunned to see one of her pieces sold during the show. As she is leaving the show, she is kidnapped by David and taken to a nearby building. He tells her he bought the building and is making it into an architecture/art studio. He decided to turn his life around and do something he really loves: owning his own architecture business. His business also includes an art studio, and his first art piece is Trudie's painting, which he purchased. David admits his love for Trudie and Trudie admits her love for him as well, before they kiss.

Cast
Melissa Joan Hart as Gertrude "Trudie" Marie Chandler
Mario Lopez as David Martin
Markie Post as Katherine Chandler
Timothy Bottoms as Richard Chandler
June Lockhart as Grandma Dolores
Kyle Howard as Jake Chandler
Vanessa Lee Evigan as Katie Chandler
Gabrielle Miller as Jessica Barber 
Layla Alizada as Lucy
Marty Hanenberg as Mr. Portnoy
Ben Ayres as (the real) Nick
Travis Milne as Ryan, Jake's boyfriend

Production notes
Holiday in Handcuffs was filmed in Calgary, Alberta, Canada, in 2007.

Ratings
The movie received 6.7 million viewers and a 2.4 in adults 18 to 49, making it the most watched telecast in ABC Family history.

DVD releases
Holiday in Handcuffs was released on Region 1 DVD on October 7, 2008. The movie was re-released along with the television movie Snowglobe on October 13, 2009.

See also 
 List of Christmas films

References

External links

Holiday in Handcuffs at ABCFamily.com

2007 television films
2007 films
2000s English-language films
2000s crime comedy films
ABC Family original films
American Christmas films
American crime comedy films
Christmas television films
Films about kidnapping
Films about dysfunctional families
Films directed by Ron Underwood
2000s Christmas films
American Christmas comedy films
2000s American films